BMA may stand for:

Arts and entertainment
 Baltimore Museum of Art
 Billboard Music Awards
 Black Market Activities, a record label
 Black Movie Award, annual ceremony
 BMA Magazine, a music magazine published in Canberra, Australia
 Borderless Military Alliance, a fictional organization in the Rideback manga and anime

Businesses
 Battery Manufacturing Association, a British automobile manufacturer
 BHP Mitsubishi Alliance, Australian mining company
 Black Market Activities, a record label
 British Manufacturers' Association, a former employers' association
 British Midland Airways
 Broaden Media Academy, a film and video training facility in Taipei, Taiwan
 Stockholm Bromma Airport (IATA code BMA)

Trades Unions
 British Medical Association

Government and military
 Bahamas Maritime Authority
 Bangladesh Military Academy
 Bangkok Metropolitan Administration
 Bermuda Militia Artillery, former unit
 Bermuda Monetary Authority
 British Military Administration (disambiguation) (various meanings)

Religious organizations
 Baptist Missionary Association of America, an association of churches in the United States
 Biblical Mennonite Alliance

Science and technology
 β-Methylamphetamine, a stimulant
 Bayesian model averaging, an ensemble learning method
 Blind mate connector, an RF connector type
 Block-matching algorithm, a system used in computer graphics applications
 B-segment Modular Architecture platform, a modular car platform developed by Geely

See also
 BMAS (disambiguation)